Pakhanpur is a village in Nagina, Bijnor district, Uttar Pradesh, India. Pincode of Pakhanpur is 246762. Head (Pradhan) of Village Pakhanpur is Amit Chauhan

Population  
According to 2011 census the population of Pakhanpur was 933.

Male Female Population of 2011

References

Villages in Bijnor district